The discography of The Presidents of the United States of America, an American alternative rock group formed in Seattle, Washington in 1993, consists of six studio albums, sixteen singles, three extended plays, one video album, two compilation albums and a live album. The group's self-titled debut album was released on Columbia Records in 1995, with the singles "Kitty" and "Lump" bringing them exposure on the United States charts, as well as in Canada, Europe, the United Kingdom and Australia. Since then, The Presidents of the United States of America released five further albums, sometimes on different labels, none of which have been received as commercially or critically well as their debut album. The band broke up in 2016.

In 1996, their single "Peaches" became their first and only chart entry on the Billboard Hot 100, reaching the Top 40 at number 29. It also managed to chart within the top 10 of the UK Singles Chart and the top 10 in New Zealand. Despite their growing popularity at the time, no further single managed to make the Top 40, or even chart on the Hot 100.

Albums

Studio albums

Compilation albums

Live albums

Extended plays

Singles

Music videos

Notes

References

Discographies of American artists
Rock music group discographies
Discography